Listed in the table below are the insignia—emblems of authority—of the British Army. Badges for field officers were first introduced in 1810 and the insignia was moved to the epaulettes in 1880. On ceremonial or parade uniforms these ranks continue to be worn on the epaulettes, either as cloth slides or as metal clips, although on the modern 'working dress' (daily uniform) they are usually worn as a cloth slide on the chest. Although these insignia apply across the British Army there is variation in the precise design and colours used and it can take some time to become familiar with them all.

Officers in the ranks of lieutenant and second lieutenant are often referred to as subalterns and these and captains are also referred to as company officers. Brigadiers, colonels, lieutenant colonels and majors are field officers. All above these are considered to be of general officer rank.

Ranks

General rank information

Notes
The rank of Field Marshal has become an honorary/ceremonial rank; the last active officer to be promoted to the rank was in 2014.

History of rank insignia

General officers 

Before 1767, there were no definite badges for Field Marshals and general officers. In 1767, the British Army issued an order to distinguish Field Marshals (once the rank was established in 1813) and different graded General officers by the combination of chevron-shaped ess pattern laces on the sleeve.
 Field Marshal: Evenly spaced six laces.
 General: Evenly spaced four laces.
 Lieutenant General: Six laces in threes.
 Major General: Four laces in twos.
 Brigadier General: Three laces. Upper twos were in pair.

During the Napoleonic wars, field marshals wore oak-leaf embroidered collar and cuff; and shoulder cord instead of previous pattern. It was continued until the end of 1830.

At the beginning of 1831, new rank distinction was ordered for field marshals and general officers.
 Field Marshal: Cross baton and wreath designed device was on epaulettes and buttons were evenly spaced .
 General: Cross baton and sword with crown designed device on the epaulettes and buttons were evenly spaced.
 Lieutenant General: Cross baton and sword with crown designed device on the epaulettes and buttons were in threes.
 Major General: Cross baton and sword with crown designed device on the epaulettes and buttons were in twos.
 Brigadier General: No device on the epaulettes and buttons were in two.

After the Crimean War (30 January 1855), the War Office ordered different rank badges for British general, staff officers and regimental officers. It was the first complete set of rank badges to be used by the British Army.
 Field Marshal: Two rows of one inch wide oak-leaf designed lace on the collar with crossed baton above the wreath in silver.
 General: Two rows of one inch wide oak-leaf designed lace on the collar with Crown and star in silver.
 Lieutenant General: Two rows of one inch wide oak-leaf designed lace on the collar with Crown in silver.
 Major General: Two rows of one inch wide oak-leaf designed lace on the collar with Star in silver.
 Brigadier-general: Two rows of half inch wide staff pattern lace on the collar with Crown and star in silver.

In 1868, brigadier-generals were ordered to wear the same collar as other General officers, but no device in the collar.

In 1880, the War Office ordered to move rank badges from collar to shoulder.
 Field Marshal: Crossed batons above the wreath of oak-leaf. On the top of the wreath a crown.
 General: Crossed baton and sword with Crown and star.
 Lieutenant General: Crossed baton and sword with Crown.
 Major General: Crossed baton and sword with Star.
 Brigadier General: Crossed baton and sword.

In 1921, the War Office abolished the appointment of brigadier-general and introduced two appointments: colonel commandant (for an officer commanding a brigade) and "colonel on the staff" (for an officer not commanding a brigade, but staff officer). The rank badges of Colonel Commandant and Colonel on the staff were the same, consisting of a crown and three stars. In 1928, the appointment of brigadier was introduced and the appointments of Colonel Commandant and Colonel on the Staff ended. Since 1928, a brigadier has had the same rank badges as were displayed by a Colonel Commandant.

Regimental officers 

Initially company and field rank insignia did not appear on officers' uniforms. In 1791 the War Office ordered officers to wear different graded epaulettes and wings to distinguish regimental officer ranks (Colonel to Ensign/ Cornet). This was ordered only for line infantry officers. According to the Army Order, 
 Field officers (Colonel, Lieutenant Colonel and Major) wore rich epaulettes with rich bullions on both shoulders. 
 Captains of Battalion company wore epaulettes with smaller bullions, 
 Subalterns (Lieutenant and Ensign/ Sub Lieutenant) of similar company wore same epaulette strap with fringes on right shoulder only. 
 Grenadier and Light companies Captain and Subalterns wore wings on both shoulders.

In 1795, a special pattern of epaulettes was ordered for Fusiliers and Light Infantry officers. Field officers of those regiments wore epaulettes over wings. Company officers wore wings.

In February 1810, an order was issued by the War Office to distinguish Field officer ranks. The following devices were introduced in the epaulettes:
 Colonel: Crown and Garter star 
 Lieutenant Colonel: Crown
 Major: Garter star

These badges were issued for all infantry regiments except the Foot Guards. In 1815, badges for Foot Guards were ordered. In Foot Guards regiments, all Field Officers were equivalent to the Colonels of line infantry regiments. Captains were equivalent to Lieutenant Colonels, Lieutenants were equivalent to Majors and Ensigns were equivalent to Captains of Battalion companies.
 Field Officers: Crown and star (Grenadier Guards and Coldstream Guards used the Garter star, and Scots Fusilier Guards used the Thistle star).
 Captain: Crown
 Lieutenant: Star
 Ensign: No device. (Ensigns of the Grenadier Guards wore epaulettes on both shoulders, but the Ensigns of the other two regiments wore a single epaulette on the right shoulder.)

In 1829, epaulettes and wings were standardised by maintaining the badges of rank issued in 1810 and 1815. According to the order, epaulettes of all regular infantry regiments and foot guards regiments would be in gold and other regiments were in silver. All officers including field and company officers wore epaulettes and wings on both shoulders. The epaulettes over wings system was abolished. Different graded officer wore different sized bullion to distinguish themselves from other.
 Colonel: Epaulette bullions were three and half inches in length. Insignia was a Crown and a Bath star.
 Lieutenant Colonel: Epaulette bullions were three and half inches in length. Insignia was a Crown.
 Major: Epaulette bullions were three inches in length. Insignia was a Bath star.
 Captain of Battalion company: Epaulette bullion were two and half inches in length. No insignia device.
 Subaltern of Battalion company: Epaulette bullion were two inches in length. No insignia device.
 Captain of Flank companies: Wings bullions were one and quarter inches in length and half inches in wide.
 Subalterns of Flank companies: Wings bullions were one and quarter inches in length and quarter inches in wide.

In January 1855, at the end of the Crimean War, the War Office abolished all epaulette and wing rank badges. New rank badges were introduced in the collar. It was first time that a complete set of rank badges was used by the British Army.
 Colonel: Two rows of half inch laces in collar with Crown and Bath star.
 Lieutenant Colonel: Two rows of half inch laces in collar with Crown.
 Major: Two rows of half inch laces in collar with Bath star. 
 Captain: One row of half inch lace on the top of collar with Crown and Bath star.
 Lieutenant: One row of half inch lace on the top of collar with Crown.
 Ensign/Sub Lieutenant: One row of half inch lace on the top of collar with Bath star.

In April 1880, rank badges were moved from collar to shoulder and officers of all regiments wore the following rank badges.
 Colonel: Crown and two Bath stars.
 Lieutenant Colonel: Crown and one Bath star.
 Major: Crown.
 Captain: Two Bath stars.
 Lieutenant: One Bath star.
 Second Lieutenant: No device.

In May 1902, the rank badges issued in 1880 were slightly modified.
 Captain: Three Bath stars.
 Lieutenant: Two Bath stars.
 Second Lieutenant: One Bath star.

In 1919, a new order was issued by the Horse Guards office—all Guards officers would wear special star badges. 
 Grenadier Guards: Garter star.
 Coldstream Guards: Garter star.
 Scots Guards: Thistle star.
 Irish Guards: Shamrock star
 Welsh Guards: Garter star.

During World War I, some officers took to wearing tunics with the rank badges on the shoulder, as the cuff badges made them too conspicuous to snipers. This practice was frowned on outside the trenches but was given official sanction in 1917 as an optional alternative, being made permanent in 1920, when the cuff badges were abolished.

Historical insignia

Historical ranks 
 Captain-general (c. 17th century): a full general.
 Sergeant-major-general (c. 17th century): shortened to major general.
 Captain-lieutenant (c. 17th & 18th century): the lieutenant of the first company in a regiment, whose captaincy was held by the regimental colonel. On promotion to full captain, the period in this rank was treated as having been a full captain for pay and pension purposes, since he effectively commanded the company.
 Ensign: lowest subaltern rank in infantry regiments; replaced in 1871 by second lieutenant, but still used to refer to second lieutenants in some Guards regiments.
 Cornet: cavalry equivalent of ensign replaced in 1871 by second lieutenant, but still used to refer to second lieutenants in some cavalry regiments, including the Blues and Royals and The Queen's Royal Hussars.

See also
 British Army other ranks rank insignia
 British Army uniform
 British Army
 Comparative military ranks of World War I
 Comparative military ranks
 Comparative officer ranks of World War II
 Military rank
 RAF officer ranks
 Ranks and insignia of NATO Armies
 Ranks of the cadet forces of the United Kingdom
 Royal Navy officer rank insignia
 United Kingdom and United States military ranks compared

Notes

References

External links
 British Army rank structure and insignia (British Army website)
 SaBRE
 Victorian Infantry Officer Ranks
 Napoleonic Era British Military ranks at ArmchairGeneral.com

 
British military insignia